The Centennial Bowl is the colloquial name for an under-construction freeway interchange in Las Vegas, in the U.S. state of Nevada, in the Centennial Hills neighborhood. It currently serves U.S. Route 95 (US 95) and Clark County Route 215 (CC 215; Bruce Woodbury Beltway) and two US 95 frontage roads; Oso Blanca Road and Sky Pointe Drive. After completion of the interchange in 2024, CC 215 will be upgraded to freeway standards from its southern terminus at the Henderson Bowl to Range Road in North Las Vegas at the northern terminus interchange construction, and Interstate 11 (I-11) will follow the route of US 95 from its current northern terminus at the Henderson Bowl to State Route 157 (SR 157; Kyle Canyon Road).

History

Original configuration
Originally, the interchange at US 95 and CC 215 at Centennial Hills built in 2003 did not have any flyover ramps and no direct access for some directions. The original interchange had US 95 at freeway standards, but CC 215 with two temporary at-grade intersections. Traffic on the beltway that needed to travel northbound on US 95 would have to turn onto Sky Pointe Drive at a traffic light, turn left to continue on Sky Pointe Drive, and then finally turn left onto a right-in/right-out (RIRO) onto US 95 north. The situation was even less direct for southbound US 95 traffic getting onto the beltway; southbound traffic would have to either exit the interchange at Durango Drive then follow Oso Blanca Road south to its intersection at CC 215, or exit via a RIRO, turn right onto Centennial Center Boulevard, and enter CC 215 via the beltway/Durango Drive interchange.

Centennial Bowl project
In August 2015, construction of the Centennial Bowl interchange project began.

In July 2017, the first flyover of the interchange was completed, connecting CC 215 east to US 95 south. Around this time, a US 95 north–CC 215 east ramp was built.

In September 2020, the second and longest flyover was completed, connecting US 95 north to CC 215 west and replacing a loop ramp connecting US 95 to the beltway. It is the second longest bridge in Nevada after the I-515 viaduct in Downtown Las Vegas.

In October 2020, the third flyover ramp was completed, connecting US 95 south to CC 215 east, along with a CC 215 east–US 95 south ramp.

In January 2021, the $155 million final phase of Centennial Bowl construction began. This project includes ramps to Oso Blanca Road and Sky Pointe Drive, a CC 215 east–US 95 north flyover, a CC 215 east–US 95 north ramp, and a US 95 south–CC 215 east ramp. This phase is projected to finish by 2024.

References

Buildings and structures in Las Vegas
U.S. Route 95
Road interchanges in the United States
Transportation in the Las Vegas Valley